Joos Ambuehl (born 23 October 1959 in Davos) is a Swiss cross-country skier who competed in 1984. He finished fifth in the 4 × 10 km relay event at the 1984 Winter Olympics in Sarajevo.

His best World Cup finish was 15th in a 15 km event in Finland that year.

Cross-country skiing results
All results are sourced from the International Ski Federation (FIS).

Olympic Games

World Championships

World Cup

Season standings

Team podiums
 1 podium

References

External links

1959 births
Living people
Cross-country skiers at the 1984 Winter Olympics
Swiss male cross-country skiers
Olympic cross-country skiers of Switzerland
People from Davos
Sportspeople from Graubünden